Eois pallidula is a moth in the  family Geometridae. It is found on Java, Bali, Borneo and Peninsular Malaysia. The habitat consists of lowland areas.

The ground colour of the wings is bone-white with a fine dull yellow fasciation.

References

Moths described in 1896
Eois
Moths of Asia